The  is a professional wrestling championship in the Japanese promotion DDT Pro-Wrestling. The title was established in 2006 and named after the  festival held annually in Ōmori. There have been a total of eight reigns between eight different champions. The current champion is Soma Takao who is in his first reign.

Title history
In 2008, the title became inactive after Daichi Kakimoto retired. It was reactivated in 2009 in order for Danshoku Dino and Masa Takanashi to have a nonuple winner takes all match at the Ryōgoku Peter Pan event.

From 2010 to 2018, the title has been defended each October at the "UTAN Festa" event held outside the Ōmori station in Tokyo. It then remained inactive until November 2022 when DDT returned to UTAN Festa and Soma Takao defeated Chikara for the title.

Reigns

See also

DDT Pro-Wrestling
Professional wrestling in Japan

References

DDT Pro-Wrestling championships